Owing to tremendous differences in latitude, longitude, and altitude, the climate of China is extremely diverse. It ranges from tropical in the far south to subarctic in the far north, and alpine in the higher elevations of the Tibetan Plateau. Monsoon winds, caused by differences in the heat-absorbing capacity of the continent and the ocean, dominate the climate. During the summer, the East Asian Monsoon carries warm and moist air from the south and delivers the vast majority of the annual precipitation in much of the country. Conversely, the Siberian anticyclone dominates during winter, bringing cold and comparatively dry conditions. The advance and retreat of the monsoons account in large degree for the timing of the rainy season throughout the country. Although most of the country lies in the temperate belt, its climatic patterns are complex.

Overview

Temperature

The northern extremities of both Heilongjiang and Inner Mongolia have a subarctic climate with long, severe winters, and short, warm summers. In contrast, most of Hainan Island and parts of the extreme southern fringes of Yunnan have a tropical climate. Temperature differences in winter are considerable, but in summer the variance is considerably less. For example, Mohe County, Heilongjiang has a 24-hour average temperature in January approaching , while the corresponding figure in July exceeds .

In summer, temperatures can be very hot and humid, and the cities of Chongqing, Wuhan and Nanjing are sometimes referred to as the Three Furnaces. Other cities are also known by this name. Even so, the hottest temperatures nationwide are recorded in the Turpan Depression, where the climate is much drier and temperatures often exceed .

Permafrost can be found at high elevations in the Tibetan Plateau and the Tian Shan mountains, as well as other mountainous areas in Northern China.

Precipitation
 
In the winter, northern winds coming from high-latitude areas are cold and dry, while in summer, southern winds from coastal areas at lower latitudes are warm and moist. Toksun County, located in the Turpan Depression, has an average rainfall of just  annually, the lowest precipitation in any area in China. High pressure cells create cold, dry conditions in the Gobi Desert in winter. Only in some pockets of the Dzungaria region of Xinjiang is the conspicuous seasonal variation in precipitation that defines Chinese (and, to a large extent, East Asian) climate absent. The East Asian Monsoon, which controls the seasonal precipitation, varies from year to year. It has historically been known as the plum rain. Scientists have used pollen and dust to track its movements.

Typhoons and flooding
Typhoons can affect China. In 1975, Typhoon Nina struck China, and may have killed up to 230,000 people as a result of the subsequent Banqiao Dam failure and famines. Other death estimates remain below 100,000. In 2006, Typhoon Saomai became one of the strongest typhoons to hit China when it landfalled in Zhejiang. In 2013, Typhoon Haiyan caused extensive damage in China, causing economic losses of ¥4.58 billion (US$752 million). That same year, Typhoon Fitow became one of the costliest typhoons to strike China, with several places setting rainfall records. It was the costliest Chinese typhoon on record and caused several billion dollars in damage. In 2018, Typhoon Mangkhut caused $1.99 billion in damage within China. In 2021, Typhoon In-fa caused record-breaking rainfall in parts of China, and over 12,000 temporary shelters had to be set up in Zhejiang. In 2022, Typhoon Muifa became the strongest typhoon to landfall in Shanghai.

During the wet season, typhoons and heavy rainfall can cause rivers to flood. The 1931 China floods are considered to be the worst Chinese natural disaster of all time, with estimates of fatalities ranging widely but going up to as high as four million people. 15% of wheat and rice crops were destroyed in the Yangtze Valley, leading to famines. Almost 800,000 in Wuhan were left homeless after a dike failure in July 1931. The city was flooded under water for nearly three months. The city of Nanjing was also severely affected, and tens of thousands of people died in Gaoyou alone. Other major floods include the 1954 Yangtze River Floods, which killed around 30,000 people, and the 1998 China floods, which  caused significant damage and affected 180 million people.

Sunshine
Annual sunshine duration ranges from less than 1,000 hours in parts of Sichuan and Chongqing to over 3,000 hours in parts of Xinjiang and Qinghai, including Golmud. Some areas of Tibet, including Lhasa, are also sunny. Seasonal patterns in sunshine vary considerably by region, but overall, the north and the Tibetan Plateau are sunnier than the south of the country. In some cities in southern China such as Hong Kong, spring is the cloudiest season and autumn is the sunniest.

Environmental issues

In 2020, China ranked 120th out of 180 countries in the Environmental Performance Index. The government has taken actions to mitigate environmental issues, but some media has criticized the actions as inadequate.

A major environmental issue in China is the continued expansion of its deserts, particularly the Gobi Desert. Although barrier tree lines planted since the 1970s have reduced the frequency of sandstorms, prolonged drought and poor agricultural practices have resulted in dust storms plaguing northern China each spring, which then spread to other parts of East Asia, including Japan and Korea. Water quality, erosion, and pollution control have become important issues in China's relations with other countries. Melting glaciers in the Himalayas could potentially lead to water shortages for hundreds of millions of people. According to academics, in order to limit climate change in China to  electricity generation from coal in China without carbon capture must be phased out by 2045. Official government statistics about Chinese agricultural productivity are considered unreliable, due to exaggeration of production at subsidiary government levels.

Much of China has a climate very suitable for agriculture and the country has been the world's largest producer of rice, wheat, tomatoes, eggplant, grapes, watermelon, spinach, and many other crops.

Examples

Northeast China

Northwest China and Tibet

Central China

East China

South China

Climate change

Gallery

See also
 Geography of China
 Climate change in China
 Environmental issues in China
 Geography of Taiwan
 East Asia
 East Asian Monsoon
 Hot summer cold winter zone

Notes

References

 
Climate by country